Joanne Drayton is a New Zealand art historian, biographer and nonfiction writer. 

Drayton graduated from the University of Canterbury, Christchurch in 1998 with a PhD on "Edith Collier: Her life and work (1885–1964)". She adapted her thesis for publication by the Canterbury University Press the following year with the same title.

Drayton has tutored in art history at Whanganui Polytechnic and lectured at the Auckland University of Technology. In 2019 she was writer in residence at the University of Auckland.

The Search for Anne Perry was reviewed by Kirkus and summarised as: "Occasionally uneven but a pleasure for Perry’s loyal fans and a book that is likely to win her some new ones as well".

She won the 2019 General Non-Fiction Award at the Ockham New Zealand Book Awards for Hudson & Halls: The Food of Love.

Selected works

References

External links 

 
 

Living people
Year of birth missing (living people)
University of Canterbury alumni
New Zealand biographers
New Zealand women writers